Southwell railway station was a railway station that served the minster town of Southwell in Nottinghamshire, England from 1847 to 1959.

History
The station at Southwell opened on 1 July 1847 as a branch line from the Nottingham and Lincoln Railway at Rolleston Junction. In its early years, the passenger service was horse-worked. In 1862 gas lighting was introduced.

In 1871 the line was extended to Mansfield by the contractors Eckersley and Baylis (using cast iron bridges built by Andrew Handyside and Company of Derby). The Midland Railway took the opportunity to rebuild the station building and stationmaster's house in stone and the platform shelters, and dismantle the original wooden station building, which was re-erected at Beeston railway station.

The Mansfield to Southwell section, which passed through a mining area subject to subsidence, was closed to passengers by the London, Midland and Scottish Railway in 1929, the same year in which a north to south-west curve at Rolleston was opened to give direct access to the Fiskerton direction from the branch. The Southwell to Rolleston Junction section remained open to passengers until 1959, normally worked by a push–pull train. Freight services ended in 1964.

Stationmasters
J. Bailey, to 1860
Samuel Whitehouse, 1860–1863
I. Kilby, 1863–1865
William Yeomans, from 1865
Samuel Jacques, c. 1868 – c. 1876, former station master at Derby Nottingham Road
George Cherry, c. 1877–1878
George Peck, 1878–1886, former station master at Tewkesbury and Ashchurch 
Walter Scott, 1886–1903
William Clapham, 1903–1910
Thomas Maidens, c. 1914–1917, then stationmaster at Coalville
Frank Porter, c. 1918–1928 
Walter Scott, 1936–1939, former station master at Appleby
Arthur G. Sperry from 1939, former station master at South Witham

Present day
Today, the station is in use as both a private residence and a b&b. The old level crossing gate is still visible by the station building. A pub called "the Final Whistle" contains many railway memorabilia and relics. The trackbed back towards Mansfield forms a trail called "the Southwell Trail". The trackbed towards Rolleston is now occupied by housing developments and the route of the old railway to Rolleston is now occupied by a road.

Rolleston Junction station remains open as Rolleston. It is close to Southwell Racecourse, about three miles (4.8 km) south-east of the town itself. Fiskerton is also an equal distance from the town.

References

Disused railway stations in Nottinghamshire
Railway stations in Great Britain opened in 1847
Railway stations in Great Britain closed in 1959
Former Midland Railway stations
1847 establishments in England
Southwell, Nottinghamshire